Brian McMahon (born July 24, 1961) is a Canadian rower, who was the coxswain of the Canadian men's eights team that won the gold medal at the 1984 Summer Olympics in Los Angeles, California. The rowing team was inducted into the BC Sports Hall of Fame in 1985, and the Canadian Olympic Hall of Fame in 2003.

References

 Canadian Olympic Committee

1961 births
Canadian male rowers
Coxswains (rowing)
Living people
Olympic gold medalists for Canada
Olympic medalists in rowing
Olympic rowers of Canada
Rowers at the 1984 Summer Olympics
Rowers at the 1988 Summer Olympics
Rowers from Toronto
Medalists at the 1984 Summer Olympics